Robert Priday (29 March 1925 – 30 September 1998) was a South African footballer who played as a midfielder for Liverpool F.C. in The Football League. Priday played for Cape Town City in his native South Africa before he moved to Liverpool in 1946. He made 9 appearances during the 1946–47 season, which was not enough for him to receive a winner's medal as Liverpool won the First Division. He made 25 appearances over the next two seasons, unable to become a first team regular he moved to Blackburn Rovers F.C.

References

1925 births
Blackburn Rovers F.C. players
Liverpool F.C. players
English Football League players
1998 deaths
Association football midfielders
South African soccer players
South African expatriate soccer players
Expatriate footballers in England